Herta Felicia Staub (21 December 1908, in Vienna – 18 August 1996, in Vienna) was an Austrian writer, poet, and journalist, best remembered for her poetry that dealt with fascism and war resistance. She served as the sole woman cultural editor for Wiener Zeitung from 1932 to 1938.

References 

1908 births
1996 deaths
Austrian writers
Austrian poets
Austrian journalists